The 1991 Ben Hogan Tour season was the second season of the Ben Hogan Tour, the PGA Tour's official developmental tour, now known as the Web.com Tour. The top five players on the final money list earned PGA Tour cards for 1992.

Schedule
The following table lists official events during the 1991 season.

Money leaders
For full rankings, see 1991 Ben Hogan Tour graduates.

The money list was based on prize money won during the season, calculated in U.S. dollars. The top five players on the tour earned status to play on the 1992 PGA Tour.

Awards

See also
1991 Ben Hogan Tour graduates

Notes

References

Korn Ferry Tour seasons
Ben Hogan Tour